Marco Terán (born 24 September 1950) is an Ecuadorian wrestler. He competed at the 1968 Summer Olympics and the 1976 Summer Olympics.

References

External links
 

1950 births
Living people
Ecuadorian male sport wrestlers
Olympic wrestlers of Ecuador
Wrestlers at the 1968 Summer Olympics
Wrestlers at the 1976 Summer Olympics
People from Manabí Province
20th-century Ecuadorian people